Abraeomorphus formosanus is a species of beetle first described by S. Hisamatsu in 1965. It is endemic to Taiwan. No subspecies are listed in Catalogue of Life.

References

Histeridae
Beetles of Asia
Insects of Taiwan
Endemic fauna of Taiwan
Beetles described in 1965